Congregation Bikur Cholim Machzikay Hadath is a synagogue in the Seward Park neighborhood of Seattle, Washington. It is the oldest synagogue in Washington state.

History

The congregation was founded in 1891. The Bikur Cholim synagogue at 104 17th Avenue S., its third location, was designed by B. Marcus Priteca, was constructed between 1909-1915. It was used in an unfinished state beginning in 2010 and was sold to the city of Seattle in 1969.

Bikur Cholim moved to Seward Park in the early 1960s. Congregations Bikur Cholim and Machzikay Hadath merged in 1971. On January 22, 1972, the new Congregation Bikur Cholim—Machzikay Hadath dedicated its new constructed Seward Park building.

In an antisemitic incident in September, 2009, the synagogue was defaced with Nazi graffiti.

In 2015, the synagogue is building a new Youth Center as part of its campus

Rabbis
The rabbi of congregation Bikur Cholim Machzikay Hadath is Rabbi Yaakov Tanenbaum.

Moshe Kletenik was rabbi of the congregation from 1994 until June 2013.

See also
 Bikur cholim

External links
 Bikur Cholim Machzikay Hadath, official site.

References

Jews and Judaism in Seattle
Byzantine Revival synagogues 
21st-century attacks on synagogues and Jewish communal organizations
Orthodox synagogues in Washington (state)
Religious buildings and structures in Seattle